Jeffrey Fogelson (1947–2018) was the athletic director at Seton Hall University from 1998 to 2006.  From 1984 to 1998, he served as associate vice president and director of athletics at Xavier University. In 2008, he was inducted into the Xavier Athletics Hall of Fame.

Career 
Fogelson received a Bachelor's degree from Lafayette College, and a master's degree from Michigan State University. From 1978 to 1983, he was associate athletic director at Georgetown University.

Personal life 
Fogelson was born on February 3, 1947, in Newton, New Jersey. In 1969, he married Nancy Eriksen.  The couple had four children. He died on February 6, 2018, in Montgomery, Ohio.

References

1947 births
2018 deaths
Lafayette College alumni
Michigan State University alumni
People from Newton, New Jersey
Seton Hall Pirates athletic directors
Xavier Musketeers athletic directors